In the Hour of Trial is a 1915 Swedish silent drama film directed by Victor Sjöström.

Cast
 Kotti Chave as Hogardt's Son (age 4)
 Richard Lund as Hogardt
 Greta Pfeil as Mrs. Nilsson
 Victor Sjöström as Sven Nilsson

References

External links

Swedish silent short films
1915 films
1910s Swedish-language films
Swedish drama films
Swedish black-and-white films
1915 drama films
1915 short films
Films directed by Victor Sjöström
Silent drama films